The 2018 Cheltenham Borough Council election was held on 3 May 2018 to elect members of Cheltenham Borough Council in England. This was on the same day as other local elections. The result was a victory for the incumbent Liberal Democrat administration, which increased its overall majority.

Overall Results

Ward results

All Saints

Battledown

Benhall & The Reddings

Charlton Kings

Charlton Park

College

Hesters Way

Lansdown

Leckhampton

Oakley

 
Max Wilkinson was a sitting councillor in Park.

Park

Pittville

Prestbury

Springbank

St Mark’s

St Paul’s

St Peter’s

Swindon Village

Up Hatherley

Warden Hill

References

2018 English local elections
2018
2010s in Gloucestershire